Rahdar Khaneh may refer to:
 Rahdar Khaneh, Gilan